Vladimir Ivanovich Rebikov (May 31 [OS May 19] 1866 –  August 4, 1920) was a late romantic 20th-century Russian composer and pianist.

Biography
Born in Krasnoyarsk, Siberia, Russia, into a family of distant Tatar ancestry, Rebikov began studying the piano with his mother. His sisters also were pianists. He graduated from the Moscow University faculty of philology. He studied at the Moscow Conservatory with N. Klenovsky, a pupil of Pyotr Ilyich Tchaikovsky, and then for three years in Berlin and Vienna with K. Mayrberger (music theory), O. Jasch (instrumentation), and T. Müller (piano). Rebikov taught and played in concerts in various parts of the Russian Empire: Moscow, Odessa, Kishinev, Yalta,  as well as in Berlin, Vienna, Prague, Leipzig, Florence and Paris, where he met Claude Debussy, Oskar Nedbal, Zdeněk Nejedlý, and others. Rebikov settled in Yalta in 1909, and died there.

Legacy
Early works suggest the influence of Tchaikovsky. He wrote lyrical piano miniatures (suites, cycles, and albums), children's choruses and songs. One of his vocal cycles is called  (The Fables in Faces) after Ivan Krylov. He wrote also a stage work Krylov's Fables (c. 1900).

He used new advanced harmony such as seventh and ninth chords, unresolved cadences, polytonality, and harmony based upon open fourths and fifths. He was also experimenting with novel forms, for instance, in his piano pieces, Mélomimiques Op. 10 (1898), and Rythmodéclamations in which music and mime are combined, and he introduced a type of musical pantomime known as "melo-mimic" (or "melomimic") and "rhythm-declamation" (see melodeclamation). His orchestral and stage works include more than ten operas, such as Yolka (Ёлка - The Christmas Tree), and two ballets.

His children's music is the most notable of all his works. He continued the Russian penchant for the whole tone scale, using it in the piece Les demons s'amusent, included in the melomimic suite Les Rêves (Dreams, 1899).

Quotations
"Rebikov was already a forgotten figure by the time of his death at age 54. He was bitter and disillusioned, convinced wrongly that composers such as Debussy, Scriabin, and Stravinsky had made their way into public prominence through stealing his ideas. Rebikov is best known by way of his insubstantial music in salon genres. Rebikov's role as an important early instigator of twentieth-century techniques deserves to be more widely recognized."  (Uncle Dave Lewis, Allmusic)

Operas
 ( — In the Storm, Op. 5, after Vladimir Korolenko 1863, premiered 1894, Odessa)Bezdna (Бездна — Abyss after Leonid Andreev, 1907) ( — The Woman with a Dagger after Arthur Schnitzler, 1910) ( — A Nest of Nobles, Op. 55, Op. 55 after Ivan Turgenev, 1916)Yolka (Ёлка - The Christmas Tree after Fyodor Dostoevsky, Hans Christian Andersen and Gerhart Hauptmann, 1900, staged 1903).

BibliographyCatalogue of Rebikov's Works, Moscow, 1913
Tompakova, O.:  Rebikolv'', entry in Creative Portraits of Composers, Moscow 1989 (in Russian).

External links
 Biography at answers.com
 Song texts
 Mir Imen 
 Karadar

References

1866 births
1920 deaths
19th-century classical composers
19th-century classical pianists
19th-century male musicians
20th-century classical composers
20th-century classical pianists
20th-century Russian male musicians
Male classical pianists
Male opera composers
Musicians from Krasnoyarsk
People from Yeniseysk Governorate
Russian classical pianists
Russian male classical composers
Russian opera composers
Russian people of Tatar descent
Russian Romantic composers
20th-century pianists
20th-century composers
Moscow Conservatory alumni